The Inky Awards recognise high-quality young adult literature, with the longlist and shortlist selected by young adults, and the winners voted for online by the teen readers of the Inside a Dog website. There are two awards: the Gold Inky Award for an Australian young adult title, and the Silver Inky Award for an international (non-Australian) young adult title.

The Awards are named after Inky – the Inside a Dog mascot and all-round wonder-dog.

The Inky Awards were founded by the Centre for Youth Literature at the State Library Victoria in 2007 as Australia's first national teen choice awards for young adult literature.

In 2020, the INKY awards were discontinued indefinitely as part of State Library timetabling changes.

Gold Inky Award Winners (Australian)

Silver Inky Award Winners (Non-Australian)

The Process 
Eligible books are submitted for consideration by publishers via a nomination form on InsideaDog.com.au.

A longlist of 10 Australian books and 10 international books is then selected by "Inky Awards teen alumni", with the Centre for Youth Literature staff acting as the filter for coordination and eligibility.

The longlist is read by a panel of teenaged judges, who whittle the list down to a shortlist of ten books (5 Australian, 5 international).

The shortlist is published on Inside a Dog and individuals aged 12–18 can vote for their favourite. The Australian book with the most votes receives the Gold Inky Award and a cash prize ($2000), and the international book with the most votes wins the Silver Inky Award.

Reference List

External links 
 Official website

Awards established in 2007
Young adult literature awards
Australian literary awards